Wolfgang Stuck (22 March 1939 – 2 February 2022) was a German tennis player.

Stuck, one of the best clay court players of his time, was a member of LTTC Rot-Weiß in Berlin. He won West Germany's national outdoor championships back to back in 1959 and 1960, then claimed the indoor title in 1963. His career included a fourth round appearance at the 1960 French Championships and he registered multiple wins over the world's top amateur player Neale Fraser. He played Davis Cup for West Germany in 1960 and 1964.

See also
List of Germany Davis Cup team representatives

References

External links
 
 
 

1939 births
2022 deaths
West German male tennis players
Tennis players from Berlin